Athassel Priory is the largest medieval priory in Ireland, stretching over a  site. The priory dates back to the late 12th century when it was founded by the Augustinians under the patronage of William de Burgh. William's grandson Hubert de Burgh, (or Burgo) later the Bishop of Limerick, was prior at Athassel c. 1221. The original buildings were altered and renovated over the next 300 years. The priory was burnt twice, once in 1329 by Brian King of Thomond and again in 1581 by John Fitzgerald of Desmond. A large town had grown up around the priory but was destroyed during the two raids. The priory was finally dissolved in 1537 and the lands given to Thomas Butler, 10th Earl of Ormond, who neglected the abbey, and it subsequently fell into ruin.

Architecture 
The priory is accessed by a bridge and gate-lodge. Here the visitor can begin to note patterns that will be discerned throughout the site. The reconstruction and modification of the buildings is evident, often involving their "downsizing" to meet the needs of a smaller community. Nothing remains of the town that once surrounded the priory. The main aisle of the priory was used in recent centuries as a burial ground. The now blocked-up rood screen can be seen over the doorway in the centre. The walls are full of put-log holes, now ideal nest sites for dozens of jackdaws. These holes were used in construction to affix scaffolding-timbers.

The buildings are mostly made of limestone and rubble.

Burials
 Walter de Burgh, 1st Earl of Ulster
 Richard Óg de Burgh, 2nd Earl of Ulster
 William de Burgh, died 1205, founder of the de Burgh/Burke/Bourke dynasty in Ireland

See also 
 List of abbeys and priories in Ireland (County Tipperary)

References

Leask, Irish Churches & Monastic Buildings, Vol.2
McCraith, Athassel Priory and its Patrons, The New Ireland Review, 1910 
Athassel Abbey, The Commissioners of Public Works

External links 
 Priory Ruins
 Priory Interior

Augustinian monasteries in the Republic of Ireland
Religion in County Tipperary
National Monuments in County Tipperary
Ruins in the Republic of Ireland
Former populated places in Ireland
Archaeological sites in County Tipperary
Burial sites of the House of Burgh
Monasteries dissolved under the Irish Reformation